In the 1928–29 season, Carlisle United played in the Football League Third Division North, having been elected to the league from the North Eastern League at the end of the previous season.

Football League Third Division North

FA Cup

References
 11v11

Carlisle United F.C. seasons